Repeat Offender may refer to:

 Repeat Offender (Richard Marx album), 1989
 Repeat Offender (Peter Elkas album), 2011
 "Repeat Offender" (Time Squad), a 2002 episode of Time Squad
 repeat offender, the concept in criminology and penology, see recidivism

See also
 Repeat Offender Revisited, a 2019 compilation album by Richard Marx